Broscinae is a subfamily of ground beetles in the family Carabidae. There are more than 30 genera and at least 340 described species in Broscinae.

Genera
These 34 genera belong to the subfamily Broscinae:

 Acallistus Sharp, 1886
 Adotela Laporte, 1867
 Anheterus Putzeys, 1868
 Baripus Dejean, 1828
 Bembidiomorphum Champion, 1918
 Bountya Townsend, 1971
 Brithysternum W.J.MacLeay, 1873
 Broscodera Lindroth, 1961
 Broscodes Bolivar y Pieltain, 1914
 Broscosoma Rosenhauer, 1846
 Broscus Panzer, 1813
 Cascellius Curtis, 1838
 Cerotalis Laporte, 1867
 Chaetobroscus Semenov, 1900
 Chylnus Sloane, 1920
 Craspedonotus Schaum, 1863
 Creobius Guérin-Méneville, 1838
 Diglymma Sharp, 1886
 Eobroscus Kryzhanovskij, 1951
 Eurylychnus Bates, 1891
 Gnathoxys Westwood, 1842
 Kashmirobroscus J.Schmidt; Wrase & Sciaky, 2013
 Mecodema Blanchard, 1843
 Miscodera Eschscholtz, 1830
 Monteremita Seldon & Holwell, 2019
 Nothobroscus Roig-Juñent & Ball, 1995
 Nothocascellius Roig-Juñent, 1995
 Oregus Putzeys, 1868
 Orthoglymma Liebherr; Marris; Emberson; Syrett & Roig-Juñent, 2011
 Percolestus Sloane, 1892
 Percosoma Schaum, 1858
 Promecoderus Dejean, 1829
 Rawlinsius Davidson & Ball, 1998
 Zacotus LeConte, 1869

References

 
Carabidae subfamilies